Pahrali River (also called Parazhiyar) flows through the  Kanyakumari District in southern India. It originates in the Mahendragiri hills. The Mathur Hanging Trough, the highest and longest aqueduct in Asia, was built over it near the hamlet of Mathur. Perunchani dam is constructed across Pahrali river.

References

Kanyakumari
Rivers of Tamil Nadu
Thiruvattar
Rivers of India